The Philippines is a functioning democracy, though popular protests have forced out two presidents in almost more than 20 years: first, Ferdinand Marcos in 1986 for alleged electoral manipulation and second, Joseph Estrada in 2001 for allegedly plundering the economy.
The country's politics have continued to be characterized by volatility. The Philippines is still grappling with Muslim separatists, predominantly those of the island of Mindanao. In addition, the former president, Gloria Macapagal Arroyo, won a contentious election in 2004 faced an electoral scandal, after a phone call between her and an election official, taped before the election had concluded, turned up. President Arroyo has denied she made any attempt to influence the vote.

Elections in the Philippines